American thrash metal band Anthrax has released eleven studio albums, seven live albums, seven compilation albums, ten video albums, six extended plays, twenty-six singles and twenty-six music videos. Anthrax was formed in 1981 by guitarist Scott Ian and bassist Danny Lilker, who picked the band's name from a biology textbook. After releasing its debut Fistful of Metal (1984) on the independent label Megaforce Records, Anthrax signed to major label Island Records. Singer Joey Belladonna and bassist Frank Bello joined the lineup and the band released Spreading the Disease the following year. The band's third studio album Among the Living (1987) was its commercial breakthrough, peaking at number 62 on the Billboard 200 and was certified gold by the Recording Industry Association of America (RIAA) and silver by the British Phonographic Industry (BPI). Its fourth album State of Euphoria (1988) peaked at 31 on the Billboard 200 and received gold certification in the US.Persistence of Time (1990), noted for its darker lyrical content than previous albums, peaked at number 24 on the Billboard 200. The band's sixth studio album Sound of White Noise (1993), its first with singer John Bush, was its highest-charting album in the US, peaking at number seven and received gold certification. Longtime guitarist Dan Spitz left the band shortly after, and drummer Charlie Benante played most of the lead guitar parts on Stomp 442 (1995) until Paul Crook was hired as a touring guitarist. Volume 8: The Threat Is Real (1998) was released by the independent label Ignition Records, whose imminent bankruptcy hurt album sales. Ninth studio album We've Come for You All (2003), first with guitarist Rob Caggiano, entered the Billboard 200 at number 122 but failed to chart on most international markets. Belladonna returned for Worship Music (2011) and For All Kings (2016); which both received favorable reviews.

Albums

Studio albums

Live albums

Compilation albums

Video albums

Extended plays

Singles

Music videos

References

External links

Discography
Heavy metal group discographies
Discographies of American artists